Francisco Alfafara Nemenzo Jr. is a Filipino political scientist, educator, and activist who served as the 18th president of the University of the Philippines (UP) from 1999 to 2005. He had previously served as chancellor of UP Visayas, UP Faculty Regent, and dean of the College of Arts & Sciences of UP Diliman.

A prominent Marxist figure in the Philippine academe, he is a professor emeritus of political science at UP Diliman and continues to teach courses in political philosophy and Philippine government.

Nemenzo is from a family of scholars, academics, and educators. His father, Francisco Sr., was a marine zoologist known as the "father of Philippine coral taxonomy". His son, Fidel, is a mathematician and incumbent chancellor of UP Diliman.

Personal life

Family
Nemenzo's father, Francisco Sr., was a marine zoologist referred to as the "father of Philippine coral taxonomy" and has served as dean of UP Diliman's College of Arts and Sciences. His mother, Catalina Alfafara, served as senior librarian at the UP Diliman library.

Nemenzo is married to Ana Maria "Princess" Ronquillo, a feminist and anti-poverty activist. They have three children: mathematician Fidel named after Fidel Castro, physician Leonid, and preschool teacher Lian.

Nemenzo's nickname is "Dodong".

Education
Nemenzo earned his bachelor's and master's degrees in public administration from the National College of Public Administration and Governance at the University of the Philippines Diliman in 1957 and 1959 respectively. During his undergraduate years, he joined the Pan Xenia Fraternity. He then obtained a Ph.D. in political history from the University of Manchester in 1965.

Career

Administrative experience
Prior to his stint as UP President, Nemenzo served as chancellor of the University of the Philippines Visayas and as a member of the Board of Regents, the highest policy-making body of the University, representing the faculty. He was also dean of the College of Arts and Sciences, which was split into three academic units: College of Science (CS), College of Social Sciences & Philosophy (CSSP), and the College of Arts & Letters (CAL).

University presidency
Nemenzo was elected UP president against prominent competitors such as former senator Leticia Ramos-Shahani, former minister of economic planning Gerardo Sicat, and public administration pioneer and sociologist Ledivina V. Cariño. He succeeded Emil Q. Javier.

His term is notable for the institutionalization of the Revised General Education Program (RGEP), comparable to the general education program of Harvard University and other American educational institutions, seeking to provide a holistic development of students through a free choice system of selecting courses in three divisions (Arts & Humanities, Social Science & Philosophy, and Mathematics, Science & Technology) to fit each student's intellectual pursuits. However, a comprehensive review of the program was initiated, linking the introduction of the RGEP to the grade inflation phenomenon. It led to a synthesis of the old general education program and the RGEP which has been adopted the University since 2012.

In 2005, he stepped down as the University's highest official and replaced by Emerlinda Roman of the College of Business Administration.

Selected publications

References

Bibliography

Notes

Academic staff of the University of the Philippines Diliman
Living people
Filipino Marxists
Presidents of universities and colleges in the Philippines
Year of birth missing (living people)